The 2006 Leeds City Council election took place on Thursday 4 May 2006 to elect members of Leeds City Council in England.

As per the election cycle, one third of the council's 99 seats were contested, plus an additional vacancy in Killingbeck & Seacroft ward. Those seats up for election were those of the third-placed candidate elected for every ward at the 2004 all-out election, who had been granted a two-year term to expire in 2006.

The only party to gain a seat was the British National Party, defeating the Morley Borough Independents in Morley South to elect their first and only councillor to date.

With the council remaining in no overall control, the election result saw the Liberal Democrat and Conservative coalition administration continue their control of the council.

Election result

This result had the following consequences for the total number of seats on the council after the elections:

Councillors who did not stand for re-election

Incumbent Liberal Democrat councillor, Stewart Golton (Weetwood), was elected to represent a new ward, succeeding Mitchell Galdas in Rothwell.

Ward results

References

2006 English local elections
2006
2000s in Leeds